Monortha pleodontia is a species of moth of the family Tortricidae. It is found in Costa Rica and Panama.

References

Moths described in 1987
Monortha